Troy Fumagalli (born February 17, 1995) is an American football tight end who is a free agent. He played college football at Wisconsin.

Early years
Fumagalli was born with amniotic band constriction, which forced doctors to amputate part of his left index finger a few days after he was born. He attended Waubonsie Valley High School in Aurora, Illinois. During his career, he had 172 tackles and four sacks on defense and 64 receptions for 1,770 yards on offense. He committed to the University of Wisconsin to play college football.

College career

After redshirting his first year at Wisconsin in 2013, Fumagalli appeared in all 14 games, with two starts, in 2014. He finished the season with 14 receptions for 187 yards. As a sophomore in 2015, he played in 11 games with four starts and had 28 receptions for 313 yards and one touchdown. As a junior in 2016, Fumagalli had 47 receptions for 580 yards and two touchdowns. He was named the Offensive MVP of the 2017 Cotton Bowl Classic after recording six receptions for 83 yards and a touchdown.

Professional career

Denver Broncos

Fumagalli was drafted by the Denver Broncos in the fifth round with the 156th overall pick in the 2018 NFL Draft. He was placed on injured reserve on September 1, 2018. Fumagalli recorded his first NFL touchdown in a 27–23 loss to the Minnesota Vikings in Week 11 of the 2019 season.

On September 5, 2020, Fumagalli was waived/injured by the Broncos, and subsequently reverted to the team's injured reserve list the next day. He was waived with an injury settlement on September 8.

Houston Texans
On September 14, 2020, Fumagalli was signed to the Houston Texans practice squad. He was released on October 27.

Denver Broncos (second stint)
On November 9, 2020, the Broncos signed Fumagalli to their practice squad. He was elevated to the active roster on November 14, November 21, November 28, and December 5 for the team's weeks 10, 11, 12, and 13 games against the Las Vegas Raiders, Miami Dolphins, New Orleans Saints, and Kansas City Chiefs, and reverted to the practice squad after each game. He was promoted to the active roster on December 12. In Week 14 against the Carolina Panthers, Fumagalli had the most productive game of his professional career, catching four passes for 53 yards in a 32–27 Broncos win.

New England Patriots
On May 27, 2021, Fumagalli signed with the New England Patriots. He was waived/injured on August 17 and placed on injured reserve.

San Francisco 49ers
On May 17, 2022, Fumagalli signed with the San Francisco 49ers. He was released on August 30, 2022. He was signed to the practice squad on September 7, 2022. He was released on November 7, 2022.

References

External links

Denver Broncos bio
Wisconsin Badgers bio

1995 births
Living people
Sportspeople from Aurora, Illinois
Players of American football from Illinois
American football tight ends
Wisconsin Badgers football players
Denver Broncos players
Houston Texans players
New England Patriots players
San Francisco 49ers players